In the United Kingdom, the Accession Council is a ceremonial body which assembles in St James's Palace in London  upon the death of a monarch to make formal proclamation of the accession of the successor to the throne. Under the terms of the Act of Settlement 1701, a new monarch succeeds automatically (demise of the Crown). The proclamation merely confirms by name the identity of the new monarch and formally announces the new monarch's regnal name, while the monarch and others, in front of the council, sign and seal several documents concerning the accession. An Accession Council has confirmed every English monarch since James I in 1603.

Composition
The council is made up of the following:
 All members of the Privy Council of the United Kingdom;
 The Lord Mayor of the City of London;
 The Aldermen of the City of London;
 High Commissioners of Commonwealth realms;

Proclamation 

The council's Proclamation of Accession, which confirms the name of the heir, is signed by all the attendant Privy Counsellors.

The 2022 proclamation was:

Though proclamations have been worded broadly the same, they also vary as necessary. In the case of Victoria, certain words were included (having regard to section 2 of the Regency Act 1830 prescribing the Oath of Allegiance) which expressly reserved the rights of any child of the late king, William IV, which might be borne to his widow, Adelaide of Saxe-Meiningen. In the case of George VI, the proclamation was reworded because Edward VIII had abdicated, rather than died. The title "Emperor of India," assumed by Queen Victoria well into her reign, was added at the end of the list of titles at the proclamations of Edward VII, George V, Edward VIII and George VI, during whose reign that title was relinquished. In the case of Charles III, the proclamation was reworded to include the House of Commons for the first time. The formula "The King is dead. Long live the King!", of French royal origin, is not part of the official proclamation in the United Kingdom, contrary to popular belief.

The proclamation has been ceremonially read out in various locations around the kingdom. By custom, it is usually first read from the Proclamation Gallery of Friary Court at St James's Palace by the heralds of the College of Arms. Other readings in London have historically followed, concluding at the Royal Exchange in the presence of the Lord Mayor of London. Local proclamation events then occur, such as one at the original location of Mercat Cross in Edinburgh by the heralds of the Court of the Lord Lyon. In 2022 the first reading was televised live, and other readings in London were omitted except for the one at the Exchange.

Oaths 
Under the Acts of Union 1707, monarchs are required upon succeeding to the throne to make an oath to "maintain and preserve" the Church of Scotland. This oath is normally made at the Accession Council. The provision in Article XXV Section II of the Acts of Union 1707 states with respect to confirmed Acts of Scotland:

Once the monarch makes a sacred oath to the council, the Garter Principal King of Arms steps onto the Proclamation Gallery which overlooks Friary Court to proclaim the new monarch.

Queen Elizabeth II was in Kenya when she acceded to the throne, and the Accession Council therefore met twice, first for the proclamation and again so that the new Queen could take the oath.

Upon accession, a new sovereign is also required to make what is known as the Accession Declaration. This is not usually made at a meeting of the Accession Council but in the presence of Parliament on the first State Opening following the monarch's accession to the throne or at their coronation, whichever occurs first. King George VI made the declaration at his coronation.

List of Accession Councils
The following is a list of the dates of accession councils and the public reading of proclamations.

See also

 Succession to the British throne
 Accession Declaration Act 1910
 Coronation of Queen Victoria
 Proclamation of accession of George V
 Proclamation of accession of Elizabeth II
 Proclamation of accession of Charles III
 Allegiance Council
 Royal Council of the Throne

References

External links
Privy Council Website – Accession Council
BBC On This Day feature, including clip of proclamation at Royal Exchange
Accession Council's Proclamation, 20 June 1837, of Victoria as Queen "saving the rights of any issue of His late Majesty King William the Fourth which may be borne of his late Majesty's Consort" : London Gazette issue 19509, page1581
Proclamations of Accession of English and British Sovereigns (1547-1952)

Constitution of the United Kingdom
British monarchy